My Life is the second Japanese album by Alan, released in Japan on November 25, 2009 and in Taiwan and Hong Kong on November 27, 2009 under the literally translated title Wǒ de Rénshēng. The album was released in two different editions: a CD+DVD edition and a CD-only edition. The first press of the CD+DVD edition came with three bonus videos, including special live studio session performances of "Nada Sōsō" and "Natsukashii Mirai (Longing Future)", and a remix of "Namida", the B-side from her seventh single "Megumi no Ame". First pressings of the CD-only edition came with a 40-page mini photobook. The album's titular song, "My Life", was used as the theme song for the PSP game God Eater. A pop version of "Essence of Me", called "Diamond", is an A-side on her 12th single, "Diamond/Over the Clouds". On track 11, "Nobody Knows But Me", the shakuhachi is played by former Rin' member Tomoca. Tomoca also made a guest appearance at Alan's debut concert, "Voice of You", playing the shakuhachi while Alan performed the song. The album peaked at #16 on the weekly Oricon charts, charting for seven weeks.

Track listing

1 From limited edition DVD 'Special Studio Live Session'.

Charts

Japan

References

2009 albums
Avex Group albums